Émancé is a commune in the Yvelines department in the Île-de-France in north-central France. It is around 50 km south west of Paris.

There is a population of feral wallabies nearby in the Forest of Rambouillet. This population has been present since the 1970s, when some individuals escaped from a zoological park in Émancé after a storm.

See also
Communes of the Yvelines department

References

Communes of Yvelines